BAC or Bac may refer to:

Places
 Bac, a village in Montenegro 
 Baile Átha Cliath, Irish language name for Dublin city.
 Bîc River, aka Bâc River, a Moldovan river
 Baç Bridge, bridge in Turkey
 Barnes County Municipal Airport (ICAO airport code: KBAC; FAA airport code: BAC) Valley City, North Dakota, US; see List of airports in North Dakota

Arts and entertainment 
 Baryshnikov Arts Center, in Manhattan, New York City
 Batman: Arkham City, a 2011 video game
 Battersea Arts Centre, London, England
 Benedicta Arts Center, St. Joseph, Minnesota, USA
 Big Apple Chorus, New York based barbershop chorus
 Boston Area Crusaders, former name of the Boston Crusaders Drum and Bugle Corps

Organizations 
 BAC-Credomatic, a Central American financial company owned by Grupo Aval Acciones y Valores
 Bangabandhu Aeronautical Centre
 Bank of America, which trades on the NYSE under the stock ticker BAC
 Boeing Airplane Company, the former name of Boeing Commercial Airplanes
 Briggs Automotive Company, a British car manufacturing company
 Bristol Aeroplane Company (1920–1956), British aviation company
 British Aircraft Company (1930–1936), British aviation company
 British Aircraft Corporation (1959/1960–1977), British aviation company
 International Union of Bricklayers and Allied Craftworkers, North American labor union

Education 
 Baccalaureate (disambiguation), the name of a number of educational qualifications
 Basic Airborne Course, of the United States Army Airborne School
 Belmont Abbey College, Belmont, North Carolina
 Bibliothèque et Archives Canada, the Library and Archives Canada, in Ottawa
 Boston Architectural College, Boston, Massachusetts, USA
 Botswana Accountancy College, Gaborone, Botswana
 Broughton Anglican College, a school in Menangle, New South Wales, Australia
 British Accreditation Council, a British educational accreditation agency

Medicine, science and technology 
 BACnet, Building Automation and Control
 .BAC, a filetype used by the RSTS/E timesharing system for compiled BASIC-PLUS files
 Bacterial Artificial Chromosome, a DNA construct used for transforming and cloning in bacteria
 Basic Access Control, a protocol used to transmit data contained in a passport equipped with RFID chip
 Benzalkonium chloride, a type of cationic surfactant
 Biological-activated carbon, used in water treatment  
 Blood alcohol content (or blood alcohol concentration)
 Bronchioloalveolar carcinoma, a type of lung cancer often diagnosed in non-smokers
 HP Business Availability Center, software in HP Business Service Management

Sports 
 Bank Atlantic Center, an indoor arena in Sunrise, Florida, USA
 Badminton Asia Confederation, governing body for badminton in Asia
 Bauru Atlético Clube, a Brazilian football (soccer) club
 British Athletes Commission

Other uses 
 Born Again Christian

See also 

 Bač (disambiguation)
 Bacs (disambiguation)
 
 
 
 CBAC (disambiguation)
 Kbac (disambiguation)
 WBAC 1340 AM